The Human Rights League ( [et du citoyen] or LDH) of France is a Human Rights NGO association to observe, defend and promulgation of Rights Man within the French Republic in all spheres of public life. The LDH is a member of the International Federation of Human Rights Leagues (FIDH).

History
The League was founded on 4 June 1898 by the republican Ludovic Trarieux to defend captain Alfred Dreyfus, a Jew wrongly convicted for treason – this would be known as the Dreyfus Affair.

Dissolved by the anticommunist regime of Vichy during World War II, it was clandestinely reconstituted in 1943 by a central committee including Pierre Cot, René Cassin and Félix Gouin. The LDH was refounded after the Liberation. Paul Langevin, who had recently joined the French Communist Party (PCF), became its president. Opposed to the Algerian War and the massive use of torture by the French Army, the LDH called for demonstrations against the 1961 Algiers putsch.

Today

The LDH has opposed itself to the 23 February 2005 law on the "positive role of colonisation", which has been accused of being part of a revisionist discourse. President Jacques Chirac finally had the law, which had been voted by his UMP majority, repealed start of 2006. The LDH also took position in favor of the recognition of foreigners' right to vote in local elections end of December 2005. Besides, it took part in prisoners' movement organized since 1970 by the GIP (Group of Information on Prisons), founded by Michel Foucault and Daniel Deferre. The LDH also supports Italian former activist Cesare Battisti and American Ira Einhorn. The LDH has also opposed itself to Nicolas Sarkozy's policies, which it deems "repressive". In its 2003 report, it declared that "since the Algerian War we had never seen such a strong rollback of human rights in France".

The LDH has filed a complaint end of 2005 concerning a CIA flight which landed in Le Bourget airport in the frame of the so-called "war on terror" (see March 2006 in Europe).

End of 2004, the LDH counted 7,487 members, organized into 309 local sections and 57 federations. In 1932, it could boast 170,000 members.

Cultural references

 In his 1970 autobiographical book Papillon, Henri Charriere angrily laments the lack of interest shown in the treatment of prisoners sent to the penal colonies of French Guiana, citing LDH in particular,
I trampled the organisation of the Ligue des Droits de l'Homme et du Citoyen that never spoke out and said, "stop killing people as surely as if they were guillotined: abolish the mass sadism among the employees of the prison service."  I trampled the fact that not a single organisation or association ever questioned the top men of this system to find out how and why eighty per cent of the people who were sent away every two years vanished.

List of presidents
 Ludovic Trarieux (1898–1903)
 Francis de Pressensé (1903–1914)
 Ferdinand Buisson (1914–1926, Nobel peace prize in 1927, along with the German Ludwig Quidde)
 Victor Basch (1926–1944)
 Paul Langevin (1944–1946)
 Sicard de Plauzoles (1946–1953)
 Émile Kahn (1953–1958)
 Daniel Mayer (1958–1975)
 Henri Noguères (1975–1984)
 Yves Jouffa (1984–1991)
 Madeleine Rebérioux (1991–1995)
 Henri Leclerc (1995–2000)
 Michel Tubiana (2000–2005)
 Jean-Pierre Dubois (2005–2011)
 Pierre Tartakowsky (2011–2015)
 Françoise Dumont (2015–2017)
 Malik Salemkour (2017–2022)
 Patrick Baudouin (since 2022)

See also
Arié Alimi (1977–present)
Caroline Rémy de Guebhard (1855–1929)

Notes

External links
Official site

1898 establishments in France
Anti-racism in France
Non-profit organizations based in France
Human rights organizations based in France
Organizations established in 1898
International Federation for Human Rights member organizations
Far-left politics in France
Dreyfus affair